Seymour Saul Lipschutz (born 1931 died March 2018) was an author of technical books on pure mathematics and probability, including a collection of Schaum's Outlines.

Lipschutz received his Ph.D. in 1960 from New York University's Courant Institute .  He received his BA and MA degrees in Mathematics at Brooklyn College. He was a mathematics professor at Temple University, and before that on the faculty at the Polytechnic Institute of Brooklyn.

Bibliography 
Schaum's Outline of Discrete Mathematics
Schaum's Outline of Probability
Schaum's Outline of Finite Mathematics
Schaum's Outline of Linear Algebra
Schaum's Outline of Beginning Linear Algebra
Schaum's Outline of Set Theory
Schaum's Outline of General Topology
Schaum's Outline of Data Structures
Schaum's Outline of Differential Geometry

References

Year of death missing
20th-century American mathematicians
21st-century American mathematicians
Courant Institute of Mathematical Sciences alumni
Temple University faculty
Polytechnic Institute of New York University faculty
Brooklyn College alumni
1931 births